Karen Dunn (born 1975) is an American lawyer who has represented clients including Apple, Oracle and Uber. Dunn was one of the lead lawyers  for the plaintiffs in a successful $25 million civil suit against the organizers of Unite the Right Rally in Charlottesville, Virginia, and in 2021 defended Apple in a lawsuit brought by Epic Games.
 
She is a partner at Paul, Weiss, Rifkind, Wharton & Garrison.  She is a specialist in debate prep in Democratic politics; Dunn co-led President Barack Obama’s presidential debate prep team in 2012 and led the presidential debate prep for Hillary Clinton in 2016. In the fall of 2020, Dunn oversaw Kamala Harris’ preparation for the general election vice presidential debates.
 
Dunn was an associate White House counsel in 2009, and an Assistant U.S. Attorney for Eastern District of Virginia in 2010.

Early life and education
Dunn is the daughter of Nina Laserson Dunn and Theodore M. Dunn. She received a B.A. degree magna cum laude from Brown University and a J.D. from Yale Law School.

Career
In 1999, Dunn joined the campaign team for Hillary Clinton, who was preparing to run for a Senate seat in New York. Following Clinton’s election to the Senate, Dunn worked as press secretary for Clinton, then as her communications director until 2003.
 
After law school, Dunn served as a law clerk to D.C. Circuit Court of Appeals Judge Merrick Garland in 2006. In 2007 she was a law clerk for Supreme Court Justice Stephen Breyer.
 
Dunn became deputy to Obama’s chief strategist, David Axelrod, in July 2008. Following Obama’s inauguration in 2009, she was named associate White House counsel. In July of that same year, Dunn prepared Sonia Sotomayor for her Supreme Court Senate confirmation hearings.
 
Dunn was hired as a prosecutor for the Eastern District of Virginia in 2010.
 
In 2012, Dunn co-directed the prep for Obama’s re-election campaign debates.
 
She joined private practice as partner at the law firm Boies, Schiller, and Flexner in 2014. The same year, Dunn and her husband Brian Netter, also a lawyer, served as pro bono counsel on behalf of the DC Council, which filed suit against DC Mayor Vincent C. Gray and chief financial officer Jeffrey DeWitt over their refusal to act on the 2012 Budget Autonomy Act. The DC Superior Court ruled in favor of Dunn and Netter’s clients, the DC Council, in 2016.
 
Dunn and colleague Bill Isaacson successfully defended Apple in a $1 billion class action lawsuit over an update to its iPod music player, winning a unanimous verdict in favor of the technology company in December 2014.
 
Dunn oversaw Hillary Clinton’s debate preparation for both the Democratic primaries and the general election presidential debates in 2016.
 
In 2017, Dunn defended Uber in a case in which Uber was accused by autonomous driving technology company Waymo of stealing driverless technology trade secrets. Following Dunn’s February 7, 2018 questioning of former Uber CEO Travis Kalanick regarding the company’s early interest in the technology of autonomous driving cars, the trial ended abruptly on February 9 and was settled out of court later that month.
 
The American Lawyer magazine named Dunn “Litigator of the Year” in 2017, citing her “high-stakes” work defending Uber; representing Apple in a patent lawsuit disputing Qualcomm’s patent licensing model; and summary judgment for Beats - owned by Apple - in a $1 billion suit brought by Monster.
 
Dunn was one of the lead lawyers in the civil suit against the organizers of the 2017 Unite the Right Rally in Charlottesville, Virginia, representing multiple Charlottesville residents and counter-protesters. In her opening statement, Dunn argued that rally organizers "came to Charlottesville with a plan for violence with racial and religious hatred” and “that they used race and religious hatred to motivate others to join." Dunn’s clients were awarded over $25 million in damages in November 2021.
 
She became a partner at the law firm Paul, Weiss, Rifkind, Wharton & Garrison in July 2020. At Paul, Weiss Dunn counseled Jeff Bezos during his testimony before a congressional committee in July 2020.
 
During the 2020 election cycle, Dunn oversaw Kamala Harris’s preparation for the general election vice presidential debates.
 
In 2021, Dunn defended Apple against a lawsuit brought by Epic Games, the maker of Fortnite in a case that NPR described as “the most high-profile antitrust trial in the technology world in decades…”

Personal Life and Other Activities
Dunn married attorney Brian Netter, who she met at Yale Law School, in 2009.
 
She was an adviser to the political thriller television series House of Cards.

References

Brown University alumni
Yale Law School alumni

1975 births
Living people
Paul, Weiss, Rifkind, Wharton & Garrison people